The Department of Youth Development (যুব উন্নয়ন অধিদপ্তর) is a government department of Bangladesh responsible for the development of the youth population. It is located in Motijheel, Dhaka, Bangladesh. Faruk Ahmed is its director general.

History
The Department of Youth Development was established in 1978 by the government of Bangladesh under the Ministry of Youth Development (which was later renamed to Ministry of Youth and Sports). The ministry defines youth as anyone between 18 and 35. In April 2015, a draft of the Department of Youth Development published the national youth policy to generate feedback. The department provides training programs to youths across Bangladesh.

See also 

 Central Human Resource Development Center

References

Research institutes in Bangladesh
1978 establishments in Bangladesh
Organisations based in Dhaka
Organisations based in Motijheel